Rhinonyssidae is a family of mites in the order Mesostigmata. There are about 16 genera and at least 460 described species in Rhinonyssidae.

The mites of this family are obligate parasites of avian respiratory systems, living in nasal passageways. They are endoparasites, typically living their entire life in within the respiratory systems of birds.

Rhinonyssid mites are widespread, and have been observed on every continent including Antarctica (Rhinonyssus sphenisci, first observed in 1963).

Genera
These 16 genera belong to the family Rhinonyssidae:

 Charadrinyssus Butenko, 1984
 Larinyssus Strandtmann, 1948
 Locustellonyssus Bregetova, 1965
 Passeronyssus Fain, 1960
 Pipronyssus Fain & Aitken, 1967
 Ptilonyssus Berlese & Trouessart, 1889
 Rallinyssus Strandtmann, 1948
 Rhinoecius Cooreman, 1946
 Rhinonyssus Trouessart, 1894
 Ruandanyssus Fain, 1957
 Sternostoma Berlese & Trouessart, 1889
 Tinaminyssus Strandtmann & Wharton, 1958
 Trochilonyssus Fain & Aitken, 1967
 Tyranninyssus Brooks & Strandtmann, 1960
 Vitznyssus Castro, 1948
 Zumptnyssus Fain, 1959

References

Further reading

 

Acari